The following is a list of the MTV Europe Music Award winners and nominees for Best Ukrainian Act.

2000s

2010s

MTV Europe Music Awards
Ukrainian music
Awards established in 2007